Pick-Staiger Concert Hall  is a concert hall on the campus of Northwestern University in Evanston, Illinois.  The hall was donated by hotel executive Albert Pick Jr. and his brother-in-law Charles Staiger, and named for Corinne Frada Pick, Pick's wife, and Albert Pick's sister Pauline Pick Staiger, Staiger's late wife. The building was constructed mostly from precast concrete and glass and seats 1003. All seats have an unobstructed view of the stage. It also includes thirty plastic dish-shaped panels over the stage. There is also adjustable acoustical drapery which can be adjusted to meet the particular requirements of each performance.

Architecture 

The building was designed by renowned Mid-Century modern architect  Edward D. Dart of Loebl, Schlossman, Dart & Hackl.

References 
Dart, Susan (1993). Edward Dart Architect. .
 http://digital-libraries.saic.edu/cdm/compoundobject/collection/findingaids/id/13452/rec/13 

Northwestern University
Northwestern University campus
1975 establishments in Illinois
Edward D. Dart structures